Konstantinos Konstantinou was a Greek cyclist. He competed at the 1896 Summer Olympics in Athens.

Konstantinou competed in the road race, an 87 kilometre competition that took cyclists from Athens to Marathon and back. He did not finish in the top three, though his exact place among the fourth through seventh place cyclists is unclear. He also competed in the 12-hour race and was among the four cyclists that dropped out after about three hours.

References

External links

Year of birth missing
Year of death missing
Greek male cyclists
Cyclists at the 1896 Summer Olympics
19th-century sportsmen
Olympic cyclists of Greece
Place of birth missing
Place of death missing